The Man in the Saddle is a lost 1926 American silent Western film directed by Lynn Reynolds and Clifford Smith, starring Hoot Gibson and featuring Boris Karloff. It is considered a lost film.

Cast
 Hoot Gibson as Jeff Morgan Jr.
 Charles Hill Mailes as Jeff Morgan Sr. (credited as Charles Mailes)
 Clark Comstock as Pete
 Fay Wray as Pauline Stewart
 Sally Long as Laura Mayhew
 Emmett King as Yom Dyresty
 Lloyd Whitlock as Lawrence
 Duke R. Lee as Snell
 Yorke Sherwood as Banker
 William Dyer as Sheriff
 Boris Karloff as Robber
 Janet Gaynor (uncredited)

See also
 Hoot Gibson filmography
 Boris Karloff filmography

References

External links
 
 

1926 films
1926 Western (genre) films
American black-and-white films
Films directed by Clifford Smith
Films directed by Lynn Reynolds
Universal Pictures films
Lost Western (genre) films
Lost American films
1926 lost films
Silent American Western (genre) films
1920s American films